Monochaetum multiflorum is a flowering plant species in the genus Monochaetum indigenous to Colombia.

The leaves of the plant contain the hydrolysable tannins nobotanins Q, R, S, and T. It also contains the tetrameric nobotanin S and pentameric melastoflorin A.

References

External links
 Monochaetum multiflorum at Knapsack

Melastomataceae
Endemic flora of Colombia
Plants described in 1845
Taxa named by Aimé Bonpland